Elephant Shell is the first LP to be released by Tokyo Police Club. It was released in the United States, Canada and Australia on April 22, 2008 on Saddle Creek Records, and in the United Kingdom and Continental Europe on May 5, 2008. "In a Cave", "Juno", and "Tessellate" have been posted on the band's official MySpace.

The album was leaked on the internet on March 7, 2008.  In response to the leak, Saddle Creek Records offered the album as a high-quality MP3 download for $9.00 on their website. The iTunes Store pre-released the album on March 25. Starting April 25, MTV Canada streamed the album free online (The Leak).

The album release party was held at the Bowery Ballroom in New York, with guests Smoosh and The Meligrove Band.

Chart performance

The album debuted at #1 on the Billboard Top Heatseekers charts in the United States, and at #10 in the Canadian album chart.

Track listing

Free downloads
The songs "In a Cave" and "Juno" were both released as free downloads before the actual release of the album.

Personnel 

 Tokyo Police Club – songwriters, musicians, co-producers
 Greg Alsop
 Josh Hook
 Dave Monks
 Graham Wright
 Alex Aldi – additional engineering
 Greg Giorgio – additional engineering
 Dean Martino – assistant engineer
 Jay Sadlowski – assistant engineer
 Chris Zane – producer (tracks: 9)
 Jon Drew – producer (tracks: 1-6, 8, 10, 11)
 Peter Katis – mix engineer, producer (tracks: 7), additional production (tracks: 3, 4, 6, 9, 10)
 Doug Van Sloun – mastering engineer
 Jadon Ulrich – art direction
 Rich Cohen – management

References

2008 debut albums
Tokyo Police Club albums
Saddle Creek Records albums
Albums produced by Peter Katis